Etung is a Local Government Area of Cross River State, Nigeria. Its headquarters are in the town of Effraya.
 
It has an area of 815 km and a population of 80,196 at the 2006 census.

The postal code of the area is 551.

Gallery

References

Local Government Areas in Cross River State